The 2014–15 Saint Joseph's Hawks basketball team represented Saint Joseph's University during the 2014–15 NCAA Division I men's basketball season. The Hawks, led by 20th year head coach Phil Martelli, played their home games at Hagan Arena and were members of the Atlantic 10 Conference. They finished the season 13–18, 7–11 in A-10 play to finish in tenth place. They lost in the second round of the A-10 tournament to St. Bonaventure.

Previous season
The Hawks finished the season with an overall record of 24–10, with a record of 11–5 in the Atlantic 10 regular season to finish in a tie for third place. They were champions of the A-10 tournament to earn the conferences automatic bid to the NCAA tournament where they lost in the second round to Connecticut.

Off season

Departures

Incoming recruits

Roster

Schedule

|-
!colspan=9 style="background:#A00000; color:#726A5F;"| Non-conference regular season

|-
!colspan=9 style="background:#A00000; color:#726A5F;"| Atlantic 10 regular season

|-
!colspan=9 style="background:#A00000; color:#726A5F;"| Atlantic 10 tournament

References

Saint Joseph's Hawks men's basketball seasons
Saint Joseph's